The  is a steam-hauled "Joyful Train" (excursion train) operated by East Japan Railway Company (JR East) primarily on the Kamaishi Line in the north-east Tohoku Region of Japan since April 2014. The train consists of restored JNR Class C58 steam locomotive number C58 239 together with four rebuilt former KiHa 141 series diesel cars purchased from JR Hokkaido (themselves rebuilt from earlier 50 series passenger coaches and made surplus to requirements following the electrification of the Sasshō Line in 2012). The diesel cars provide additional power to cope with the line's gradients.

Design
The exterior and interior design of the train was overseen by industrial designer Ken Okuyama. The overall concept was inspired by the classic novel Night on the Galactic Railroad written by Japanese author Kenji Miyazawa, who lived in Hanamaki, Iwate. Externally, the coaches are painted blue, evoking the night sky, with constellation and animal designs on the sides. Internally, the coaches will feature gaslight-style lighting and stained glass, evoking an early 20th-century atmosphere.

Train formation

The train consists of JNR Class C58 steam locomotive number C58 239 and four coaches, formed as follows. The four coaches provide a total seating capacity of approximately 180.

C58 239

The dedicated SL Ginga train locomotive C58 239 was built in June 1940 by Kawasaki Sharyo, and was based at various depots around the country, including Nagoya, Nara, and Morioka, before being withdrawn on 22 May 1972. From 1 May 1973, it was preserved in a park in Morioka, Iwate. It was moved from the park by road to JR East's Omiya Works in Saitama Prefecture in December 2012.

History
The completed train was shown off to the public at Morioka Station on 2 February 2014. It entered revenue service on 12 April 2014.

References

External links

  

Named passenger trains of Japan
East Japan Railway Company
Railway services introduced in 2014
Railway coaches of Japan
2014 establishments in Japan